Garma may refer to:

Geography
Garma, Croatia, located on the island of Korcula
Garma, Iran, a village in Kerman Province, Iran
Garma, Khuzestan, a village in Khuzestan Province, Iran
Garma, Iraq (alternate spelling of Al-Karmah), Al Anbar, Iraq
Garma, Libya
Garma, Nepal
Garma, Tibet

Other uses
Garma (album) is an album by Yothu Yindi
The Garma Festival of Traditional Cultures (aka Garma) celebrates Yolngu cultural inheritance in Arnhem Land, Northern Territory, Australia
Garma Zabi (ガルマザビ), a character in the fictional universe of Mobile Suit Gundam